Ionuț Georgian Burnea (born 12 August 1992) is a Romanian professional footballer who plays for Liga I club CS Mioveni as a defender.

References

External links
 

1992 births
Living people
Sportspeople from Câmpulung
Romanian footballers
Association football defenders
FC Dinamo București players
FC Costuleni players
CS Concordia Chiajna players
CS Mioveni players
Liga I players
Liga II players
Liga III players
Moldovan Super Liga players
Romanian expatriate footballers
Expatriate footballers in Moldova
Romanian expatriate sportspeople in Moldova